Green Hammerton is a village and civil parish in the Harrogate district of North Yorkshire, England. Along with nearby Kirk Hammerton, the village is served by  railway station on the Harrogate line.

(H)ambretone, a place-name reflected now both in Kirk Hammerton ('Hammerton with the church', from Old Norse kirkja 'church') and in Green Hammerton ('Hammerton with the green', from Middle English grene), is first attested in the Domesday Book of 1086. The name seems to derive from the Old English plant-name hamor (whose meaning is not certain but might include hammer-sedge or pellitory of the wall) + tūn 'settlement, farm, estate'.

The village has a Church of England parish church, St Thomas' Church, and a church primary school, both located in the centre of the village. The former Congregational church in Green Hammerton, originally built as a Methodist Chapel in the late 1790s, was adapted for use as a Roman Catholic Church, St Josephs, in 1961.

The village pub is the Bay Horse Inn. Green Hammerton Village Hall opened in April 2010: it is run by the Green Hammerton Recreational Charity.

Green Hammerton comes under the Ouseburn ward, of Harrogate District Council, the Ainsty division of North Yorkshire County Council and the Selby and Ainsty parliamentary constituency.

Notable people

 John Hughlings Jackson (1835–1911), neurologist

References

External links

Official Green Hammerton village website

Villages in North Yorkshire
Civil parishes in North Yorkshire